Operation Prime Time (OPT) was a consortium of American independent television stations to develop prime time programming for independent stations. OPT and its spin-off syndication company, Television Program Enterprises (TPE), were formed by Al Masini. During its existence, OPT was considered the de facto fourth television network. OPT was also called an occasional television network and occasional program alternative.

OPT inspired syndication and network models that arose in later years, such as The Disney Afternoon, Prime Time Entertainment Network and  MyNetworkTV.

Operations
Unlike the standard network advertising split, where the stations got the bulk of the ad time with the collective network only receiving one or two minutes of the dozen minutes available to sell, the OPT ad time would be sold at 1/3 of network rates or about $40,000 per half minute with the profits going back to the stations.

Background
With primarily only Big Three television networks providing new programming to TV stations in the 1970s, the unaffiliated stations had little network level quality programming to offer to advertisers.  Producers of TV programs were also looking for an alternative to the standard network set up that paid the producers about three fourths of the production costs thus the show would only make money for the production company if it made enough episodes to place into rerun syndication.  Advertisers were looking for new advertising outlets due to rising network ad costs with a 30% increase in 1977.  Networks' income increased 143% from 1969 to 1974 while network payments to affiliates decreased by 2%.

History
Al Masini, who represented 18 stations for advertising sales through his company TeleRep, discussed the independent stations' problem with other independent stations after a broadcast media meeting in February 1976.  Determined to offer an alternative, Masini rounded up a steering committee to form the new venture.  Initial members of the committee included Shelly Cooper, General Manager of WGN-TV Chicago, Rich Frank of KCOP-TV Los Angeles, and representatives of KTVU, WPIX and KSTW.  At the next broadcaster convention, the committee met to develop the details. The OPT committee then contacted Frank Price of Universal Television for the first program.  Price offered Taylor Caldwell's novel Testimony of Two Men as a miniseries with Universal taking on a fifth of the production cost.  The committee was initially able to get 22 independent and 53 network-affiliated stations to sign on to OPT.

Advertisers like General Foods and Bristol-Myers abandoned the rival potential fourth network, Metromedia's MetroNet, for OPT, based on Metromedia's near Big 3 network cost per thousand viewers advertising cost and OPT reaching 80% of the country. Masini eventually lined up 93 stations, 73 of which were affiliates of ABC, NBC or CBS; of those affiliated with a network, these affiliates had to preempt part of their regular network prime time programming to make room for specials from OPT.  KCOP's broadcast of Testimony of Two Men first installment got a 16 rating and the second installment got an 18, well over their standard 4 rating, but in May, a traditional rerun period for the networks.

Prime Time planned three book adaptions for their shows to air in May, July and November or December 1978 with two of them being John Jakes's The Bastard and The Rebels leading the way for the rest of the book series that OPT optioned including two then currently being written. Martin Gosch's and Richard Hammer's The Last Testimony of Lucky Luciano was the third adaptation scheduled for 1978.

The last time the Operation Prime Time name was used was at the end of 1986, when the Fox Broadcasting Company was barely on the air. At that point, it was just The Late Show Starring Joan Rivers; they didn't launch prime time programming until the spring of 1987. Ultimately, the arrival of Fox as well as original programming for cable networks and stations would eventually make the OPT business model obsolete.

List of programs produced by OPT
Its initial programs were miniseries including adaptations of Testimony of Two Men and Son of the Captains and the Kings, the sequel to the 1976 NBC miniseries Captains and the Kings, also adapted from a novel by Caldwell. OPT also distributed the animated Christmas special Yogi's First Christmas.

The most successful program from both OPT and TPE was, and still is, Entertainment Tonight, now produced and distributed by CBS Media Ventures. Other programs included Solid Gold, Star Search, and Lifestyles of the Rich and Famous. It could be common place for OPT's weekly series to be divided between two network affiliates and run mainly on weekends in off hours. In a given market, the local CBS station might carry Entertainment Tonight (in the prime-access slot), Solid Gold, and Lifestyles of the Rich and Famous while the ABC affiliate had Star Search.

 Captains and the Kings (1976)
 Testimony of Two Men (1977)
 The Bastard (1978)
 Evening in Byzantium (1978)
 The Immigrants (1978)
 The Rebels (1979)  
 The Seekers (1979)
 Jack Frost (1979) (produced by Rankin/Bass Productions)
 Top of the Hill (1980)
 Condominium (1980)
 The Girl, the Gold Watch & Everything (1980)
 The Dream Merchants (1980)
 Tourist (1980)
 Solid Gold (1980–1988) (produced by Paramount Domestic Television)
 Mom, the Wolfman and Me (1980)
 Yogi's First Christmas (1980) (produced by Hanna-Barbera Productions)
 Goliath Awaits (1981)
 A Woman Called Golda (1982)
 Sadat (1983) (produced by Columbia Pictures Television)
 Blood Feud (1983)
 Helen Keller: The Miracle Continues (1984)
 The Jesse Owens Story (1984)
 Solid Gold Hits (1984)
 A Woman of Substance (1985)
 The Key to Rebecca (1985)
 Jenny's War (1985)
 Hold the Dream (1986)

Stations

See also

Fourth television network
Mobil Showcase Network
SFM Holiday Network
Paramount Television Service

References

External links

 
Television programming blocks in the United States
First-run syndicated television programs in the United States
Mass media companies established in 1977
Mass media companies disestablished in 1987
Television syndication packages